Yanışlı is a village in Gülnar district of Mersin Province, Turkey. At  it is situated on Turkish state highway D.400. The population of the village was 158 as of 2012.

References

Villages in Gülnar District
Populated coastal places in Turkey